Xhevahir is an Albanian masculine given name. Notable people with the name include:

Xhevahir Kapllani (born 1974), Albanian footballer
Xhevahir Spahiu (born 1945), Albanian poet 
Xhevahir Sukaj (born 1987), Albanian footballer

Albanian masculine given names